Cádiz Club de Fútbol Mirandilla is a Spanish football team based in Cádiz, in the autonomous community of Andalusia. It's the reserve team of Cádiz CF. Founded in 1973, it currently plays in Segunda Federación – Group 4, holding home games at Estadio Ramón Blanco, with a 1,700-seat capacity.

On 16 June 2022, Cádiz B was renamed to Cádiz CF Mirandilla, as an honour to Mirandilla FC, the name of the first team between 1924 and 1936.

Season to season
As a farm team

As a reserve team

2 seasons in Segunda División B
2 seasons in Segunda Federación
26 seasons in Tercera División

Honours
Tercera División: 1990–91, 2017–18

Current squad
.

From Youth Academy

Out on loan

Current technical staff

References

External links
Official website 

 
Football clubs in Andalusia
Association football clubs established in 1973
Spanish reserve football teams
1973 establishments in Spain